Lena Blackburne Baseball Rubbing Mud is a brand of specially prepared mud used to prepare balls in the sport of baseball before they are put into play. Newly manufactured baseballs have a somewhat slick and glossy surface, so when new they are rubbed down with the mud to reduce the slickness and give pitchers better control without damaging or discoloring the ball.

History
Before the use of the special rubbing mud, baseballs were rubbed in a mixture of water and infield soil, but this method usually discolored the ball's leather surface. Other alternatives at the time were tobacco juice, shoe polish, and soil from under stadium bleachers. They were able to successfully take off the sheen from baseballs, but at the same time, they also damaged and scratched the ball's leather. While Lena Blackburne was a third-base coach for the Philadelphia Athletics (now based in Oakland, California), an umpire complained to him about the method used at the time, prompting Blackburne in 1938 to set out in search of better mud to use to rub against baseballs. Later that decade, Blackburne discovered the rubbing mud's location (said to be "near" Palmyra, New Jersey) and founded the company that he used to sell it – Lena Blackburne Baseball Rubbing Mud. According to the company, the entire American League used the mud soon after its discovery, and by the 1950s, it was in use by every Major League Baseball (MLB) team, along with some minor league and college teams.

When advancing age prevented Blackburne from harvesting the mud, he left the company to a friend, John Haas (Blackburne died in 1968); according to the company, Haas had accompanied Blackburne during his searches for an appropriate mud. Haas later left the company to his son-in-law Burns Bintliff, who in turn selected one of his nine children, current owner Jim, to carry on the business. Jim Bintliff told CNN in 2009 that the company only brought in about $20,000 per year; at the time, he worked full-time as a printing press operator.

The mud originates from the New Jersey side of the Delaware River. The mud is cleaned and screened before sale. Each year Jim Bintliff visits the mud's source and returns with 1,000 pounds of it to store over the winter and sells it the following baseball season. Bintliff told CNN:

If anybody happens to catch me in the act of harvesting mud, I come up with a story to give them a reason I'm putting mud in a bucket. I've told people I use it in my garden, I use it for my rose bushes, I use it for bee stings and poison ivy and any kind of story.

Usage
Before all MLB and MiLB games, an umpire or clubhouse attendant rubs six dozen or more balls with the mud to give them a rougher surface, to make them easier for pitchers to grip, and to comply with MLB Rule 4.01(c), which states that all baseballs shall be "properly rubbed so that the gloss is removed." The rubbing mud's unique feature is that it is "very fine, like thick chocolate pudding", and it has been considered the "perfect baseball-rubbing mud".

External links
 Lena Blackburne Baseball Rubbing Mud

References

Baseball equipment
Soil
Palmyra, New Jersey